Goodenia vernicosa, commonly known as wavy goodenia, is a species of flowering plant in the family Goodeniaceae and is endemic to South Australia. It is an erect shrub with sticky, later varnished foliage, elliptic to lance-shaped, sometimes toothed leaves and racemes or thyrses of yellow flowers.

Description

Taxonomy and naming
Goodenia vernicosa was first formally described in 1919 by John McConnell Black in Transactions and Proceedings of the Royal Society of South Australia from specimens collected by Ernest Ising on Mount Patawarta near Moolooloo. The specific epithet (vernicosa) means "varnished".

Distribution
This goodenia occurs in the Flinders Ranges of South Australia.

References

vernicosa
Flora of South Australia
Plants described in 1919
Taxa named by John McConnell Black
Endemic flora of Australia